The lois scélérates ("villainous laws") – a pejorative name – were a set of three French laws passed from 1893 to 1894 under the Third Republic (1870–1940) that restricted the 1881 freedom of the press laws, after several bombings and assassination attempts carried out by anarchist proponents of "propaganda of the deed".

Overview
The first law was passed on December 11, 1893, two days after Auguste Vaillant's bombing of the National Assembly on December 9, 1893 (slight injuries to twenty deputies).  It condemned advocacy of any crime as being itself a crime, which permitted the state to repress most of the anarchist press.

The second law was passed on December 18, 1893, and condemned any person directly or indirectly involved in a propaganda of the deed act, even if no killing was effectively carried out.

The last law was passed on July 28, 1894, and condemned any person or newspaper using anarchist propaganda (and, by extension, libertarian socialists who were current or former members of the International Workingmen's Association (IWA)):

Thus, free speech and encouraging propaganda of the deed or antimilitarism were severely restricted. Some people were condemned to prison for rejoicing at the 1894 assassination of French president Sadi Carnot by the Italian anarchist Sante Geronimo Caserio.

The term has since entered popular language to designate any harsh or unjust laws, in particular anti-terrorism legislation which often broadly represses whole social movements.

See also 
 Anti-terrorism legislation
 Anti-Socialist Laws passed in Germany in 1878
 French Third Republic (1870–1940)
 Propaganda of the deed
 Trial of the thirty (1894)

References 

1893 in law
Emergency laws in France
French Third Republic
Law of France
History of anarchism
Terrorism laws